Lois Smoky Kaulaity (1907–1981) was a Kiowa beadwork artist and a painter, one of the Kiowa Six, from Oklahoma.

Early life
Louise "Lois" Smoky was born in 1907 near Anadarko, Oklahoma. Bougetah was her Kiowa name, meaning "Of the Dawn." Her mother was Maggie Aukoy Smokey (1869–1963), and her father was 
Enoch Smokey (1880–1969), the great-nephew of Kiowa chief Appiatan. Her parents lived in Verden, Oklahoma.

Smoky first studied art at St. Patrick's Indian Mission School, under the guidance of Sister Mary Olivia Taylor, a Choctaw/Chickasaw nun, and received encouragement from Father Aloysius Hitta and Sister Deo Gratias at the school. Susan Peters, the Kiowa agency field matron, arranged for Willie Baze Lane, an artist from Chickasha, Oklahoma, to teach painting classes to young Kiowas in Anadarko. Recognizing the talent of some of the artists, Peters convinced Swedish-American painter Oscar Jacobson, director of the University of Oklahoma's School of Art, to accept the Kiowa students into a special program at the school in which they were coached and encouraged by Edith Mahier.

Kiowa Six 
The Kiowa Six included Spencer Asah, James Auchiah, Jack Hokeah, Stephen Mopope, Lois Smoky Kaulaity, and Monroe Tsatoke. In the mid-20th century the group was known as the Kiowa Five. Smoky was the only woman and the youngest of the group. Finances were tight for the artists, so Smoky's parents helped them out by renting a house in Norman, where all they lived together. Smoky only studied at OU in 1928. James Auchiah joined the group after she left.

Unfortunately, Smoky was not able to attend in person the Kiowa Six's major breakthrough into the international fine arts world at the 1928 First International Art Exposition in Prague, Czechoslovakia, although her work was included. Dr. Jacobson arranged for their work to be shown in several other countries and for Kiowa Art, a portfolio of pochoir prints and artists' paintings, to be published in France. It is only in recent decades that her place among the Kiowa Six has been restored, thanks in part to the scholarship of Dr. Mary Jo Watson (Seminole) and the Jacobson House Native Art Center in Norman, Oklahoma.

Her paintings resembled the early work of the other Kiowa Six artists. They had minimal backgrounds and focused on individual figures or small groups of people. Smoky emphasized details of traditional clothing and regalia, and she painted Kiowa people attending to daily life or ceremonial pursuits.

Individual pursuits
Her family wanted her to return home, so Lois Smoky Kaulaity cut her painting career short. Upon returning home, Kaulaity married and devoted herself to her husband and children. Her married name was Lois Kaulaity, and she lived in Verden, Oklahoma for most of her life. She did develop a reputation for her fine beadwork, creating several innovations still used by Kiowa beadwork artists today. Ironically, because hers is the rarest work among the Kiowa Six, Kaulaity's work is most collectible.

Kaulaity's figurative painting was a breakthrough for Southern Plains Indian women, because historically Plains women painted geometrical designs, such as those found on parfleches rather than narrative, representational work.

Flora Belle Schrock (Kiowa, 1919–2018), Kaulaity's niece, said in 1995, "Aunt Louise was a hard worker... for her family. [She] started doing some beadwork, too. She really enjoyed it. And I think she had ambition [that] could have furthered... [her] art ability... But after she got married, she said, 'It's just impossible now with the children.'"

Public collections
Smoky's work can be found in the following public art collections:

National Museum of the American Indian George Gustav Heye Center
Gilcrease Museum
 Jacobson House Native Art Center
McNay Art Museum
 Millicent Rogers Museum
Philbrook Museum of Art

Death
Kaulaity died February 1, 1981.

Notes

References
 
Lester, Patrick D. The Biographical Directory of Native American Painters. Norman and London: The Oklahoma University Press, 1995. .
Wyckoff, Lydia L., ed. Visions and voices : Native American painting from the Philbrook Museum of Art. Tulsa, OK: Philbrook Museum of Art, 1996. .

External links
 Jacobson House Native Art Center: About the Kiowa Six
 , Oklahoma Historical Society

Kiowa people
Native American painters
Painters from Oklahoma
People from Caddo County, Oklahoma
1907 births
1981 deaths
American women painters
People from Norman, Oklahoma
People from Grady County, Oklahoma
20th-century American women artists
Native American women artists
20th-century American painters
Native American bead artists
20th-century Native American women
20th-century Native Americans